Santa Clara is a town and seat of the municipality of Santa Clara, in the state of Durango, north-western Mexico. As of 2010, the town of Santa Clara had a population of 4,061.It has an annual fair celebrating their Virgin Mary statue on August 12 of every year.

In 1976 a meteorite of 63kg was found near Santa Clara. The meteor had an undiscovered isotope of silver.

References

Populated places in Durango